Nicholas French (1604 – 23 August 1678), Roman Catholic Bishop of Ferns, was an Irish political activist and pamphleteer, who was born at Wexford.

Background 
He was educated at St Anthony's College, Leuven, and returning to Ireland became a priest at Wexford. In 1641, war broke out in Ireland after a Rebellion of Irish Catholics in October of that year. French, along with several other Catholic clerics and gentry, helped to organise the rebels into a more cohesive political movement, the Confederate Catholics of Ireland in March 1642, with the intention of attaining freedom of religion and legal equality for Catholics and self-government for Ireland. The Confederates established their capital at Kilkenny and with the collapse of Royal authority as a result of Civil War became the de facto government of Ireland between 1642 and 1649.

In 1646 French was appointed bishop of Ferns. In the same year, he helped the Papal Nuncio Giovanni Battista Rinuccini to bring down a peace agreement signed by the Confederate Supreme Council with the English Royalists and Charles I that fell short of the original Confederate demands.

French and a lawyer named Nicholas Plunkett then assumed control of the Supreme Council and tried to promote a better peace treaty with the Royalists at the same time as a more vigorous prosecution of the war in Ireland. A new Treaty was signed with the Royalists in 1648 and French was prominent in trying to secure the widest possible support within the Confederation for it. However, the most hardline Catholic elements remained hostile to it. In any event, the Royalist/Confederate alliance lasted little more than a year -as they were crushed by an English Parliamentarian conquest of Ireland which began in 1649. The Parliamentarians were extremely hostile to Catholic clergy, executing them when they apprehended them, and French deemed it prudent to leave Ireland in 1651, and the remainder of his life was passed on the continent of Europe.

He acted as coadjutor to the archbishops of Santiago de Compostella and Paris, and to the bishop of Ghent, and died at Ghent on 23 August 1678.

French, along with many Irish Catholics, was very disappointed with the treatment Irish Catholics received when the English monarchy was restored in 1660. Only a "favoured minority" of Irish Catholic Royalists were returned the land confiscated from them by the Parliamentarians under the Act of Settlement 1662 and the public practice of Catholicism remained illegal. In 1676 French published his attack on James Butler, marquess of Ormonde (the leader of the Royalists in Ireland in the Civil Wars), entitled "The Unkinde Desertor of Loyall Men and True Friends," and shortly afterward "The Bleeding Iphigenia." The most important of his other pamphlets is the "Narrative of the Settlement and Sale of Ireland" (Louvain, 1668). The Historical Works of Bishop French, comprising the three pamphlets already mentioned and some letters, were published by SH Bindon at Dublin in 1846.

Authorities
Thomas D'Arcy McGee, Irish Writers of the 17th Century (Dublin, 1846)
John Thomas Gilbert, Contemporary History of Affairs in Ireland, 1641-1652 (Dublin, 1879–1880)
Thomas Carte, Life of James, Duke of Ormond (new ed., Oxford, 1851)
"The Oxford Companion to Irish History", ed. S.J. Cannon, Oxford, 1999.

References

1604 births
1678 deaths
17th-century Roman Catholic bishops in Ireland
Roman Catholic bishops of Ferns
Irish writers
17th-century Irish historians